The Clarke Estate is a historic mansion in Santa Fe Springs, California, U.S.. It was built from 1919 to 1921 for Chauncey Clarke and his wife, Marie Rankin Clarke. It was designed by architect Irving Gill. It has been listed on the National Register of Historic Places since January 4, 1990.

References

Houses on the National Register of Historic Places in California
Houses completed in 1921
Houses in Los Angeles County, California
Historic districts on the National Register of Historic Places in California